Hokkanen is a Finnish surname. Notable people with the surname include:

Erik Hokkanen (born 1963), American musician and composer
Evert Hokkanen (1864–1918), Finnish politician
Iivo Hokkanen (born 1985), Finnish ice hockey player

Finnish-language surnames